Junior Senior is a 2002 Indian Tamil-language romantic drama film, Produced by P.Loganathan, directed by J. Suresh starring Mammootty, Hamsavardhan and former Miss Malaysia Leena. The film was dubbed into Malayalam as Super in 2009.

Cast
 Mammootty as Santhosh aka Senior
 Hamsavardhan as Shakthi aka Junior
 Leena as Indira
 Charulatha as Varsha
 Ramesh Khanna
 Charle
 Delhi Ganesh
 Pandu
 K. R. Vatsala

Production

Filming
The film was shot entirely in Kuala Lumpur, in Malaysia, since the entire story plays there. Leena, who plays the female lead, is a Malaysia-born Tamilian, who was seen by J. Suresh in Malaysia and eventually given the role of the heroine, Indira. She was brought into the cast after the original choice, Tejashree, had walked out.

Soundtrack

The soundtrack as well as the film score were composed by Yuvan Shankar Raja, who teamed up with director J. Suresh for the second time after Velai. The soundtrack, which was released on 13 March 2002, features 5 tracks, whilst the lyrics were penned by Pa. Vijay and V. Ilango.

References

External links
 Junior Senior at CineSouth
 

2002 films
2000s Tamil-language films
2002 romantic comedy-drama films
Indian romantic comedy-drama films
Films set in Malaysia
Films shot in Malaysia
Films shot in Kuala Lumpur
Films scored by Yuvan Shankar Raja